Henry Hetherington (3 September 1874 –11 July 1950) was an Australian cricketer. He played one first-class cricket match for Victoria in 1899.

See also
 List of Victoria first-class cricketers

References

External links
 

1874 births
1950 deaths
Australian cricketers
Victoria cricketers
Cricketers from Melbourne